Dong Chao (born 13 December 1985) is a Chinese sport shooter.

Career
Chao won a gold medal in the shooting competition at the 2016 Summer Paralympics. He also won the gold at the 2012 Summer Paralympics. Chao won gold at the Men's 10 metre air rifle standing SH1.

References

1985 births
Living people
Chinese male sport shooters
Paralympic shooters of China
Paralympic gold medalists for China
Paralympic bronze medalists for China
Paralympic medalists in shooting
Shooters at the 2008 Summer Paralympics
Shooters at the 2012 Summer Paralympics
Shooters at the 2016 Summer Paralympics
Medalists at the 2008 Summer Paralympics
Medalists at the 2012 Summer Paralympics
Medalists at the 2016 Summer Paralympics
Shooters at the 2020 Summer Paralympics
21st-century Chinese people